Fetal alcohol spectrum disorders (FASDs) are a group of conditions that can occur in a person whose mother drank alcohol during pregnancy. Symptoms can include an abnormal appearance, short height, low body weight, small head size, poor coordination, behavioral problems, learning difficulties, and problems with hearing and sight. Those affected are more likely to have trouble with school, the legal system, alcohol, other drugs, and other areas of high risk. The several forms of the condition (in order of most severe to least severe) are: fetal alcohol syndrome (FAS), partial fetal alcohol syndrome (pFAS), alcohol-related birth defects (ARBD), static encephalopathy, alcohol-related neurodevelopmental disorder (ARND) and neurobehavioral disorder associated with prenatal alcohol exposure (ND-PAE). As of 2016, the Swedish Agency for Health Technology Assessment and Assessment of Social Services accepted only FAS as a diagnosis, seeing the evidence as inconclusive with respect to other types.

Fetal alcohol spectrum disorders are caused by the mother's drinking alcohol while pregnant with the affected person. Surveys from the United States found that about 10% of pregnant women drank alcohol in the past month, and 20% to 30% drank at some point during the pregnancy. 3.6% of pregnant American women met criteria for an alcohol use disorder in a 2001 epidemiological study. The risk of FASD depends on the amount consumed, the frequency of consumption, and the points in pregnancy at which the alcohol is consumed. Other risk factors include the mother's older age, smoking, and poor diet. There is no known safe amount or time to drink alcohol during pregnancy. Although drinking small amounts does not cause facial abnormalities, it may cause behavioral problems. Alcohol crosses the blood–brain barrier and both directly and indirectly affects a developing fetus. Diagnosis is based on the signs and symptoms in the person.

Fetal alcohol spectrum disorders are preventable by the mother's avoiding alcohol during pregnancy. For this reason, medical authorities recommend that women completely avoid drinking alcohol during pregnancy and while trying to conceive. Although the condition is permanent, treatment can improve outcomes. Interventions may include parent–child interaction therapy, efforts to modify child behavior, and drugs.

FASD is estimated to affect between 1% and 5% of people in the United States and Western Europe. FAS is believed to occur in between 0.2 and 9 per 1,000 live births in the United States. In South Africa, some populations have rates as high as 9%. The negative effects of alcohol during pregnancy have been described since ancient times. The lifetime cost per child with FAS in the United States was estimated at $2 million (for an overall cost across the country of over $4 billion) by the CDC in 2002. However, a 2015 review article estimated the overall costs to Canada from FASD at $9.7 billion (including from crime, healthcare, education, etc.). The term fetal alcohol syndrome was first used in 1973.

Types
Fetal alcohol spectrum disorders encompass a range of physical and neurodevelopmental problems which can result from prenatal alcohol exposure. The most severe condition is called fetal alcohol syndrome (FAS), which refers to individuals who have a specific set of birth defects and neurodevelopmental disorders characteristic of the diagnosis.

As of 2016, the Swedish Agency for Health Technology Assessment and Assessment of Social Services accepted only FAS as a diagnosis, seeing the evidence as inconclusive with respect to other types.
 Fetal alcohol syndrome (FAS)
 Partial fetal alcohol syndrome (pFAS) refers to individuals with a known, or highly suspected, history of prenatal alcohol exposure who have alcohol-related physical and neurodevelopmental deficits that do not meet the full criteria for FAS. pFAS-subtypes:
 Alcohol-related neurodevelopmental disorder (ARND)
 Alcohol-related birth defects (ARBD). In addition to FAS, pFAS
 Alcohol-related neurodevelopmental disorder (ARND)
 Alcohol-related birth defects (ARBD)
 Neurobehavioral disorder associated with prenatal alcohol exposure (ND-PAE)
 Static encephalopathy

There are conditions believed to be related to prenatal alcohol exposure, such as spontaneous abortion and sudden infant death syndrome (SIDS), which are also considered to be on the spectrum of related disorders. The Swedish Agency for Health Technology Assessment and Assessment of Social Services feels it is unclear  if identifying a FASD-related condition benefits the individual.

In 2013, the American Psychiatric Association introduced neurobehavioral disorder associated with prenatal alcohol exposure (ND-PAE) into the DSM-V as a "condition for further study" and as a specified condition under, "other specified neurodevelopmental disorders" as a way to better study the behavioral aspects of all FASD disorders. Though similar sounding, ND-PAE is the spectrum-wide term for the psychiatric, behavioral, and neurological symptoms of all FASDs, whereas ARND is the specific diagnosis of the non-dysmorphic type of FASD, where a majority of the symptoms are witnessed.

Signs and symptoms

The key of FASD can vary between individuals exposed to alcohol during pregnancy. While consensus exists for the definition and diagnosis of FAS, minor variations among the systems lead to differences in definitions and diagnostic cut-off criteria for other diagnoses across the FASD continuum.

The central nervous system damage criteria particularly lacks clear consensus. A working knowledge of the key features is helpful in understanding FASD diagnoses and conditions, and each is reviewed with attention to similarities and differences across the four diagnostic systems. More than 400 problems, however, can occur with FASD.

Growth
In terms of FASD, growth deficiency is defined as significantly below average height, weight or both due to prenatal alcohol exposure and can be assessed at any point in the lifespan. Growth measurements must be adjusted for parental height, gestational age (for a premature infant), and other postnatal insults (e.g., poor nutrition), although birth height and weight are the preferred measurements. Deficiencies are documented when height or weight falls at or below the 10th percentile of standardized growth charts appropriate to the population. Prenatal or postnatal presentation of growth deficits can occur, but are most often postnatal.

Criteria for FASD are least specific in the Institute of Medicine (IOM) diagnostic system ("low birth weight..., decelerating weight not due to nutrition..., [or] disproportional low weight to height" p. 4 of executive summary), while the CDC use the 10th percentile as a cut-off to determine growth deficiency. The "4-Digit Diagnostic Code" allows for mid-range gradations in growth deficiency (between the 3rd and 10th percentiles) and severe growth deficiency at or below the 3rd percentile. Growth deficiency (at severe, moderate, or mild levels) contributes to diagnoses of FAS and pFAS, but not ARND or static encephalopathy.

The "4-Digit Diagnostic Code" from 2004 ranks growth deficiency as follows:
 Severe: Height and weight at or below the 3rd percentile.
 Moderate: Either height or weight at or below the 3rd percentile, but not both.
 Mild: Either height or weight or both between the 3rd and 10th percentiles.
 None: Height and weight both above the 10th percentile.

In the initial studies that described FAS, growth deficiency was a requirement for inclusion in the studies; thus, all the original people with FAS had growth deficiency as an artifact of sampling characteristics used to establish criteria for the syndrome. That is, growth deficiency is a key feature of FASD because growth deficiency was a criterion for inclusion in the study that defined FAS. Growth deficiency may be less critical for understanding the disabilities of FASD than the neurobehavioral sequelae to the brain damage. Canadian guidelines updated in 2016 deleted growth as a diagnostic criterion.

Facial features

Several characteristic craniofacial abnormalities are often visible in individuals with FAS. The presence of FAS facial features indicates brain damage, although brain damage may also exist in their absence. FAS facial features (and most other visible, but non-diagnostic, deformities) are believed to be caused mainly during the 10th to 20th week of gestation.

Refinements in diagnostic criteria since 1975 have yielded three distinctive and diagnostically significant facial features  which distinguish FAS from other disorders with partially overlapping characteristics. The three FAS facial features are:
 A smooth philtrum: The divot or groove between the nose and upper lip flattens with increased prenatal alcohol exposure.
 Thin vermilion: The upper lip thins with increased prenatal alcohol exposure.
 Small palpebral fissures: Eye width decreases with increased prenatal alcohol exposure.

Measurement of FAS facial features uses criteria developed by the University of Washington. The lip and philtrum are measured by a trained physician with the Lip-Philtrum Guide, a five-point Likert scale with representative photographs of lip and philtrum combinations ranging from normal (ranked 1) to severe (ranked 5). Palpebral fissure length (PFL) is measured in millimeters with either calipers or a clear ruler and then compared to a PFL growth chart, also developed by the University of Washington.

Ranking FAS facial features is complicated because the three separate facial features can be affected independently by prenatal alcohol. A summary of the criteria follows:
 Severe: All three facial features ranked independently as severe (lip ranked at 4 or 5, philtrum ranked at 4 or 5, and PFL two or more standard deviations below average).
 Moderate: Two facial features ranked as severe and one feature ranked as moderate (lip or philtrum ranked at 3, or PFL between one and two standard deviations below average).
 Mild: A mild ranking of FAS facial features covers a broad range of facial feature combinations:
 Two facial features ranked severe and one ranked within normal limits,
 One facial feature ranked severe and two ranked moderate, or
 One facial feature ranked severe, one ranked moderate and one ranked within normal limits.
 None: All three facial features ranked within normal limits.

Central nervous system 
Central nervous system (CNS) damage is the primary feature of any FASD diagnosis. Prenatal alcohol exposure, which is classified as a teratogen, can damage the brain across a continuum of gross to subtle impairments, depending on the amount, timing, and frequency of the exposure as well as genetic predispositions of the fetus and mother. While functional abnormalities are the behavioral and cognitive expressions of the FASD disability, CNS damage can be assessed in three areas: structural, neurological, and functional impairments.

All four diagnostic systems allow for assessment of CNS damage in these areas, but criteria vary. The IOM system requires structural or neurological impairment for a diagnosis of FAS, but also allows a "complex pattern" of functional anomalies for diagnosing PFAS and ARND. The "4-Digit Diagnostic Code" and CDC guidelines allow for a positive CNS finding in any of the three areas for any FASD diagnosis, but functional anomalies must measure at two standard deviations or worse in three or more functional domains for a diagnosis of FAS, PFAS, and ARND. The "4-Digit Diagnostic Code" also allows for an FASD diagnosis when only two functional domains are measured at two standard deviations or worse. The "4-Digit Diagnostic Code" further elaborates the degree of CNS damage according to four ranks:
 Definite: Structural impairments or neurological impairments for FAS or static encephalopathy.
 Probable: Significant dysfunction of two standard deviations or worse in three or more functional domains.
 Possible: Mild to moderate dysfunction of two standard deviations or worse in one or two functional domains or by judgment of the clinical evaluation team that CNS damage cannot be dismissed.
 Unlikely: No evidence of CNS damage.

Structural
Structural abnormalities of the brain are observable, physical damage to the brain or brain structures caused by prenatal alcohol exposure. Structural impairments may include microcephaly (small head size) of two or more standard deviations below the average, or other abnormalities in brain structure (e.g., agenesis of the corpus callosum, cerebellar hypoplasia).

Microcephaly is determined by comparing head circumference (often called occipitofrontal circumference, or OFC) to appropriate OFC growth charts. Other structural impairments must be observed through medical imaging techniques by a trained physician. Because imaging procedures are expensive and relatively inaccessible to most people, diagnosis of FAS is not frequently made via structural impairments, except for microcephaly.

Evidence of a CNS structural impairment due to prenatal alcohol exposure will result in a diagnosis of FAS, and neurological and functional impairments are highly likely.

During the first trimester of pregnancy, alcohol interferes with the migration and organization of brain cells, which can create structural deformities or deficits within the brain. During the third trimester, damage can be caused to the hippocampus, which plays a role in memory, learning, emotion, and encoding visual and auditory information, all of which can create neurological and functional CNS impairments as well.

As of 2002, there were 25 reports of autopsies on infants known to have FAS. The first was in 1973, on an infant who died shortly after birth. The examination revealed extensive brain damage, including microcephaly, migration anomalies, Corpus callosum dysgenesis, and a massive neuroglial, leptomeningeal heterotopia covering the left hemisphere.

In 1977, Clarren described a second infant whose mother was a binge drinker. The infant died ten days after birth. The autopsy showed severe hydrocephalus, abnormal neuronal migration, and a small corpus callosum. FAS has also been linked to brainstem and cerebellar changes, agenesis of the corpus callosum and anterior commissure, neuronal migration errors, absent olfactory bulbs, meningomyelocele, and porencephaly.

Neurological
When structural impairments are not observable or do not exist, neurological impairments are assessed. In the context of FASD, neurological impairments are caused by prenatal alcohol exposure which causes general neurological damage to the central nervous system (CNS), the peripheral nervous system, or the autonomic nervous system. A determination of a neurological problem must be made by a trained physician, and must not be due to a postnatal insult, such as meningitis, concussion, traumatic brain injury, etc.

All four diagnostic systems show virtual agreement on their criteria for CNS damage at the neurological level, and evidence of a CNS neurological impairment due to prenatal alcohol exposure will result in a diagnosis of FAS or pFAS, and functional impairments are highly likely.

Neurological problems are expressed as either hard signs, or diagnosable disorders, such as epilepsy or other seizure disorders, or soft signs. Soft signs are broader, nonspecific neurological impairments, or symptoms, such as impaired fine motor skills, neurosensory hearing loss, poor gait, clumsiness, and poor hand - eye coordination. Many soft signs have norm-referenced criteria, while others are determined through clinical judgment. "Clinical judgment" is only as good as the clinician, and soft signs should be assessed by either a pediatric neurologist, a pediatric neuropsychologist, or both.

Functional
When structural or neurological impairments are not observed, all four diagnostic systems allow CNS damage due to prenatal alcohol exposure to be assessed in terms of functional impairments. Functional impairments are deficits, problems, delays, or abnormalities due to prenatal alcohol exposure (rather than hereditary causes or postnatal insults) in observable and measurable domains related to daily functioning, often referred to as developmental disabilities. There is no consensus on a specific pattern of functional impairments due to prenatal alcohol exposure and only CDC guidelines label developmental delays as such, so criteria (and FASD diagnoses) vary somewhat across diagnostic systems.

The four diagnostic systems list various CNS domains that can qualify for functional impairment that can determine an FASD diagnosis:
 Evidence of a complex pattern of behavior or cognitive abnormalities inconsistent with developmental level in the following CNS domains – Sufficient for a pFAS or ARND diagnosis using IOM guidelines
 Learning disabilities, academic achievement, impulse control, social perception, communication, abstraction, math skills, memory, attention, judgment
 Performance at two or more standard deviations on standardized testing in three or more of the following CNS domains – Sufficient for an FAS, pFAS or static encephalopathy diagnosis using 4-Digit Diagnostic Code
 Executive functioning, memory, cognition, social/adaptive skills, academic achievement, language, motor skills, attention, activity level
 General cognitive deficits (e.g., IQ) at or below the 3rd percentile on standardized testing – Sufficient for an FAS diagnosis using CDC guidelines
 Performance at or below the 16th percentile on standardized testing in three or more of the following CNS domains – Sufficient for an FAS diagnosis using CDC guidelines
 Cognition, executive functioning, motor functioning, attention and hyperactive problems, social skills, sensory processing disorder, social communication, memory, difficulties responding to common parenting practices
 Performance at two or more standard deviations on standardized testing in three or more of the following CNS domains – Sufficient for an FAS diagnosis using Canadian guidelines
 Cognition, communication, academic achievement, memory, executive functioning, adaptive behavior, motor skills, social skills, social communication

Related signs
Other conditions may commonly co-occur with FAS, stemming from prenatal alcohol exposure. However, these conditions are considered alcohol-related birth defects and not diagnostic criteria for FAS.
 Heart: A heart murmur that frequently disappears by one year of age. Ventricular septal defect, atrial septal defect, tetralogy of Fallot, coarctation of the aorta, and/or cardiac rhythm dysfunction.
 Bones: Joint anomalies including abnormal position and function, altered palmar crease patterns, small distal phalanges, and small fifth fingernails.
 Kidneys: Horseshoe, aplastic, dysplastic, or hypoplastic kidneys.
 Eyes: Strabismus, optic nerve hypoplasia (which may cause light sensitivity, decreased visual acuity, or involuntary eye movements).
 Occasional problems: ptosis of the eyelid, microphthalmia, cleft lip with or without a cleft palate, webbed neck, short neck, spina bifida, and hydrocephalus.

Cause

Fetal alcohol spectrum disorder is caused by a woman consuming alcohol while pregnant. Alcohol crosses through the placenta to the unborn child and can interfere with normal development. Alcohol is a teratogen (causes birth defects) and there is no known safe amount of alcohol to consume while pregnant and there is no known safe time during pregnancy to consume alcohol to prevent birth defects such as FASD. Evidence of harm from low levels of alcohol consumption is not clear and since there are not known safe amounts of alcohol, women are suggested to completely abstain from drinking when trying to get pregnant and while pregnant. Small amounts of alcohol may not cause an abnormal appearance, however, small amounts of alcohol consumption while pregnant may cause milder symptoms such as behavioral problems and also increases the risk of miscarriage.

Among those women who are alcoholic, an estimated one-third of their children have FAS.

Fetal Alcohol Syndrome occurs when a fetus is exposed to alcohol during conception. Although traditionally believed through the mother who is pregnant woman has more than four standard drinks per day, there is evidence as of 2019 supporting that the father before conception can cause FAS through long term epigenetic mutation of the father's sperm as well during conception.

Mechanism
Despite intense research efforts, the exact mechanism for the development of FAS or FASD is unknown. On the contrary, clinical and animal studies have identified a broad spectrum of pathways through which maternal alcohol can negatively affect the outcome of a pregnancy. Clear conclusions with universal validity are difficult to draw, since different ethnic groups show considerable genetic polymorphism for the hepatic enzymes responsible for ethanol detoxification.

Genetic examinations have revealed a continuum of long-lasting molecular effects that are not only timing specific but are also dosage specific; with even moderate amounts being able to cause alterations.

A human fetus appears to be at triple risk from maternal alcohol consumption:
 The placenta allows free entry of ethanol and toxic metabolites like acetaldehyde into the fetal compartment. The so-called placental barrier is practically absent with respect to ethanol.
 The developing fetal nervous system appears particularly sensitive to ethanol toxicity. The latter interferes with proliferation, differentiation, neuronal migration, axonic outgrowth, integration, and fine-tuning of the synaptic network. In short, all major processes in the developing central nervous system appear compromised.
 Fetal tissues are quite different from adult tissues in function and purpose. For example, the main detoxicating organ in adults is the liver, whereas the fetal liver is incapable of detoxifying ethanol, as the ADH and ALDH enzymes have not yet been brought to expression at this early stage. Up to term, fetal tissues do not have significant capacity for the detoxification of ethanol, and the fetus remains exposed to ethanol in the amniotic fluid for periods far longer than the decay time of ethanol in the maternal circulation. The lack of significant quantities of ADH and ALDH means that fetal tissues have much lower quantities of antioxidant enzymes, like SOD, glutathione transferases, and glutathion peroxidases, resulting in antioxidant protection being much less effective.

Additionally, ethanol may alter fetal development by interfering with retinoic acid signaling as acetaldehydecan competes with retinaldehyde and prevents its oxidation to retinoic acid.

Diagnosis
Because admission of alcohol use during pregnancy can stigmatize birth mothers, many are reluctant to admit to drinking or to provide an accurate report of the quantity they drank. This complicates diagnosis and treatment of the syndrome. As a result, diagnosis of the severity of FASD relies on protocols of observation of the child's physiology and behavior rather than maternal self-reporting.
Presently, four FASD diagnostic systems that diagnose FAS and other FASD conditions have been developed in North America:
 The Institute of Medicine's guidelines for FAS, the first system to standardize diagnoses of individuals with prenatal alcohol exposure;
 The University of Washington's "The 4-Digit Diagnostic Code", which ranks the four key features of FASD on a Likert scale of one to four and yields 256 descriptive codes that can be categorized into 22 distinct clinical categories, ranging from FAS to no findings;
 The Centers for Disease Control's "Fetal Alcohol Syndrome: Guidelines for Referral and Diagnosis", which established consensus on the diagnosis FAS in the U.S. but deferred addressing other FASD conditions; and
 Canadian guidelines for FASD diagnoses, which established criteria for diagnosing FASD in Canada and harmonized most differences between the IOM and University of Washington's systems.

Each diagnostic system requires that a complete FASD evaluation includes an assessment of the four key features of FASD, described below. A positive finding on all four features is required for a diagnosis of FAS. However, prenatal alcohol exposure and central nervous system damage are the critical elements of the spectrum of FASD, and a positive finding in these two features is sufficient for an FASD diagnosis that is not "full-blown FAS".

While the four diagnostic systems essentially agree on criteria for fetal alcohol syndrome (FAS), there are still differences when full criteria for FAS are not met. This has resulted in differing and evolving nomenclature for other conditions across the spectrum of FASD, which may account for such a wide variety of terminology. Most individuals with deficits resulting from prenatal alcohol exposure do not express all features of FAS and fall into other FASD conditions. The Canadian guidelines recommend the assessment and descriptive approach of the "4-Digit Diagnostic Code" for each key feature of FASD and the terminology of the IOM in diagnostic categories, excepting ARBD.

Thus, other FASD conditions are partial expressions of FAS. However, these other FASD conditions may create disabilities similar to FAS if the key area of central nervous system damage shows clinical deficits in two or more of ten domains of brain functioning. Essentially, even though growth deficiency and/or FAS facial features may be mild or nonexistent in other FASD conditions, yet clinically significant brain damage of the central nervous system is present. In these other FASD conditions, an individual may be at greater risk for adverse outcomes because brain damage is present without associated visual cues of poor growth or the "FAS face" that might ordinarily trigger an FASD evaluation. Such individuals may be misdiagnosed with primary mental health disorders such as ADHD or oppositional defiance disorder without appreciation that brain damage is the underlying cause of these disorders, which requires a different treatment paradigm than typical mental health disorders. While other FASD conditions may not yet be included as an ICD or DSM-IV-TR diagnosis, they nonetheless pose significant impairment in functional behavior because of underlying brain damage.

Fetal alcohol syndrome
The following criteria must be fully met for an FAS diagnosis:

 Growth deficiency: Prenatal or postnatal height or weight (or both) at or below the 10th percentile
 FAS facial features: All three FAS facial features present
 Central nervous system damage: Clinically significant structural neurological, or functional impairment
 Prenatal alcohol exposure: Confirmed or Unknown prenatal alcohol exposure

Fetal alcohol syndrome (FAS) is the first diagnosable condition of FASD that was discovered. FAS is the only expression of FASD that has garnered consensus among experts to become an official ICD-9 and ICD-10 diagnosis. To make this diagnosis or determine any FASD condition, a multi-disciplinary evaluation is necessary to assess each of the four key features for assessment. Generally, a trained physician will determine growth deficiency and FAS facial features. While a qualified physician may also assess central nervous system structural abnormalities and/or neurological problems, usually central nervous system damage is determined through psychological, speech-language, and occupational therapy assessments to ascertain clinically significant impairments in three or more of the Ten Brain Domains. Prenatal alcohol exposure risk may be assessed by a qualified physician, psychologist, social worker, or chemical health counselor. These professionals work together as a team to assess and interpret data of each key feature for assessment and develop an integrative, multi-disciplinary report to diagnose FAS (or other FASD conditions) in an individual.

Partial FAS
Partial FAS (pFAS) was previously known as atypical FAS in the 1997 edition of the "4-Digit Diagnostic Code". People with pFAS have a confirmed history of prenatal alcohol exposure, but may lack growth deficiency or the complete facial stigmata. Central nervous system damage is present at the same level as FAS. These individuals have the same functional disabilities but "look" less like FAS.

The following criteria must be fully met for a diagnosis of Partial FAS:

 Growth deficiency: Growth or height may range from normal to deficient
 FAS facial features: Two or three FAS facial features present
 Central nervous system damage: Clinically significant structural, neurological, or functional impairment in three or more of the Ten Brain Domains
 Prenatal alcohol exposure: Confirmed prenatal alcohol exposure

Fetal alcohol effects
Fetal alcohol effects (FAE) is a previous term for alcohol-related neurodevelopmental disorder and alcohol-related birth defects. It was initially used in research studies to describe humans and animals in whom teratogenic effects were seen after confirmed prenatal alcohol exposure (or unknown exposure for humans), but without obvious physical anomalies. Smith (1981) described FAE as an "extremely important concept" to highlight the debilitating effects of brain damage, regardless of the growth or facial features. This term has fallen out of favor with clinicians because it was often regarded by the public as a less severe disability than FAS, when in fact its effects can be just as detrimental.

Alcohol-related neurodevelopmental disorder
Alcohol-related neurodevelopmental disorder (ARND) was initially suggested by the Institute of Medicine to replace the term FAE and focus on central nervous system damage, rather than growth deficiency or FAS facial features. The Canadian guidelines also use this diagnosis and the same criteria. While the "4-Digit Diagnostic Code" includes these criteria for three of its diagnostic categories, it refers to this condition as static encephalopathy. The behavioral effects of ARND are not necessarily unique to alcohol however, so use of the term must be within the context of confirmed prenatal alcohol exposure. ARND may be gaining acceptance over the terms FAE and ARBD to describe FASD conditions with central nervous system abnormalities or behavioral or cognitive abnormalities or both due to prenatal alcohol exposure without regard to growth deficiency or FAS facial features.

The following criteria must be fully met for a diagnosis of ARND or static encephalopathy:

 Growth deficiency: Growth or height may range from normal to minimally deficient
 FAS facial features: Minimal or no FAS facial features present
 Central nervous system damage: Clinically significant structural, neurological, or functional impairment in three or more of the Ten Brain Domains
 Prenatal alcohol exposure: Confirmed prenatal alcohol exposure

Alcohol-related birth defects
Alcohol-related birth defects (ARBD), formerly known as possible fetal alcohol effect (PFAE), was a term proposed as an alternative to FAE and PFAE. The IOM presents ARBD as a list of congenital anomalies that are linked to maternal alcohol use but have no key features of FASD. PFAE and ARBD have fallen out of favor because these anomalies are not necessarily specific to maternal alcohol consumption and are not criteria for diagnosis of FASD.

Exposure
Prenatal alcohol exposure is determined by interview of the biological mother or other family members knowledgeable of the mother's alcohol use during the pregnancy (if available), prenatal health records (if available), and review of available birth records, court records (if applicable), chemical dependency treatment records (if applicable), chemical biomarkers, or other reliable sources.

Exposure level is assessed as confirmed exposure, unknown exposure, and confirmed absence of exposure by the IOM, CDC and Canadian diagnostic systems. The "4-Digit Diagnostic Code" further distinguishes confirmed exposure as High Risk and Some Risk:
 High Risk: Confirmed use of alcohol during pregnancy known to be at high blood alcohol levels (100 mg/dL or greater) delivered at least weekly in early pregnancy.
 Some Risk: Confirmed use of alcohol during pregnancy with use less than High Risk or unknown usage patterns.
 Unknown Risk: Unknown use of alcohol during pregnancy.
 No Risk: Confirmed absence of prenatal alcohol exposure.

Confirmed exposure
Amount, frequency, and timing of prenatal alcohol use can dramatically impact the other three key features of FASD. While consensus exists that alcohol is a teratogen, there is no clear consensus as to what level of exposure is toxic. The CDC guidelines are silent on these elements diagnostically. The IOM and Canadian guidelines explore this further, acknowledging the importance of significant alcohol exposure from regular or heavy episodic alcohol consumption in determining, but offer no standard for diagnosis. Canadian guidelines discuss this lack of clarity and parenthetically point out that "heavy alcohol use" is defined by the National Institute on Alcohol Abuse and Alcoholism as five or more drinks per episode on five or more days during a 30-day period.

"The 4-Digit Diagnostic Code" ranking system distinguishes between levels of prenatal alcohol exposure as high risk and some risk. It operationalizes high risk exposure as a blood alcohol concentration (BAC) greater than 100 mg/dL delivered at least weekly in early pregnancy. This BAC level is typically reached by a 55 kg female drinking six to eight beers in one sitting.

Unknown exposure
For many adopted or adults and children in foster care, records or other reliable sources may not be available for review. Reporting alcohol use during pregnancy can also be stigmatizing to birth mothers, especially if alcohol use is ongoing. In these cases, all diagnostic systems use an unknown prenatal alcohol exposure designation. A diagnosis of FAS is still possible with an unknown exposure level if other key features of FASD are present at clinical levels.

Confirmed absence of exposure
Confirmed absence of exposure would apply to planned pregnancies in which no alcohol was used or pregnancies of women who do not use alcohol or report no use during the pregnancy. This designation is relatively rare, as most people presenting for an FASD evaluation are at least suspected to have had a prenatal alcohol exposure due to presence of other key features of FASD.

Biomarkers 
Evidence is insufficient for the use of chemical biomarkers to detect prenatal alcohol exposure. Biomarkers being studied include fatty acid ethyl esters (FAEE) detected in the meconium (first feces of an infant) and hair. FAEE may be present if chronic alcohol exposure occurs during the 2nd and 3rd trimester since this is when the meconium begins to form. Concentrations of FAEE can be influence by medication use, diet, and individual genetic variations in FAEE metabolism however.

Ten brain domains
A recent effort to standardize assessment of functional CNS damage has been suggested by an experienced FASD diagnostic team in Minnesota. The proposed framework attempts to harmonize IOM, 4-Digit Diagnostic Code, CDC, and Canadian guidelines for measuring CNS damage vis-à-vis FASD evaluations and diagnosis. The standardized approach is referred to as the Ten Brain Domains and encompasses aspects of all four diagnostic systems' recommendations for assessing CNS damage due to prenatal alcohol exposure. The framework provides clear definitions of brain dysfunction, specifies empirical data needed for accurate diagnosis, and defines intervention considerations that address the complex nature of FASD with the intention to avoid common secondary disabilities.

The proposed Ten Brain Domains include:
 Achievement
Adaptive behavior
Attention
Cognition
Executive functioning
Language
Memory
Motor skills
Multisensory integration or soft neurological problems
Social communication

The Fetal Alcohol Diagnostic Program (FADP) uses unpublished Minnesota state criteria of performance at 1.5 or more standard deviations on standardized testing in three or more of the Ten Brain Domains to determine CNS damage. However, the Ten Brain Domains are easily incorporated into any of the four diagnostic systems' CNS damage criteria, as the framework only proposes the domains, rather than the cut-off criteria for FASD.

Differential diagnosis
The CDC reviewed nine syndromes that have overlapping features with FAS; however, none of these syndromes include all three FAS facial features, and none are the result of prenatal alcohol exposure:
 Aarskog syndrome
 Williams syndrome
 Noonan syndrome
 Dubowitz syndrome
 Brachman-DeLange syndrome
 Toluene syndrome
 Fetal hydantoin syndrome
 Fetal valproate syndrome
 Maternal PKU fetal effects

Other disorders that have overlapping behavioral symptoms and/or that might be comorbid to fetal alcohol spectrum disorder might include:
 Attention deficit hyperactive disorder
 Autism spectrum disorder
 Reactive attachment disorder
 Oppositional defiant disorder
 Sensory integration dysfunction
 Bipolar disorder
 Depression

Most people with an FASD have most often been misdiagnosed with ADHD due to the large overlap between their behavioral deficits.

Prevention

The only certain way to prevent FAS is to avoid drinking alcohol during pregnancy. In the United States, the Surgeon General recommended in 1981, and again in 2005, that women abstain from alcohol use while pregnant or while planning a pregnancy, the latter to avoid damage even in the earliest stages (even weeks) of a pregnancy, as the woman may not be aware that she has conceived. The Centers for Disease Control and the American College of Obstetricians and Gynecologists also recommend no alcohol during pregnancy. In the United States, federal legislation has required that warning labels be placed on all alcoholic beverage containers since 1988 under the Alcoholic Beverage Labeling Act.

There is some controversy surrounding the "zero-tolerance" approach taken by many countries when it comes to alcohol consumption during pregnancy. The assertion that moderate drinking causes FAS is said to lack strong evidence and, in fact, the practice of equating a responsible level of drinking with potential harm to the fetus may have negative social, legal, and health impacts. In addition, special care should be taken when considering statistics on this disease, as prevalence and causation is often linked with FASD, which is more common and causes less harm, as opposed to FAS.

Treatment
There is no current cure for FASD, but treatment is possible. Early intervention from birth to age 3 has been shown to improve the development of a child born with FASD. Because CNS damage, symptoms, secondary disabilities, and needs vary widely by individual, there is no one treatment type that works for everyone.

Between 2017 and 2019 researchers made a breakthrough when they discovered a possible cure using neural stem cells (NSCs); they propose that if applied to a newborn, the damage can be reversed and prevent any lasting effects in the future.

Medication
Psychoactive drugs are frequently tried as many FASD symptoms are mistaken for or overlap with other disorders, most notably ADHD.

Behavioral interventions
Behavioral interventions are based on the learning theory, which is the basis for many parenting and professional strategies and interventions. Along with ordinary parenting styles, such strategies are frequently used by default for treating those with FAS, as the diagnoses oppositional defiance disorder (ODD), conduct disorder, reactive attachment disorder (RAD) often overlap with FAS (along with ADHD), and these are sometimes thought to benefit from behavioral interventions. Frequently, a person's poor academic achievement results in special education services, which also utilizes principles of learning theory, behavior modification, and outcome-based education.

Developmental framework
Many books and handouts on FAS recommend a developmental approach, based on developmental psychology, even though most do not specify it as such and provide little theoretical background. Optimal human development generally occurs in identifiable stages (e.g., Jean Piaget's theory of cognitive development, Erik Erikson's stages of psychosocial development, John Bowlby's attachment framework, and other developmental stage theories). FAS interferes with normal development, which may cause stages to be delayed, skipped, or immaturely developed. Over time, an unaffected child can negotiate the increasing demands of life by progressing through stages of development normally, but not so for a child with FAS.

By knowing what developmental stages and tasks children follow, treatment and interventions for FAS can be tailored to helping a person meet developmental tasks and demands successfully. If a person is delayed in the adaptive behavior domain, for instance, then interventions would be recommended to target specific delays through additional education and practice (e.g., practiced instruction on tying shoelaces), giving reminders, or making accommodations (e.g., using slip-on shoes) to support the desired functioning level. This approach is an advance over behavioral interventions, because it takes the person's developmental context into account while developing interventions.

Advocacy model
The advocacy model takes the point of view that someone is needed to actively mediate between the environment and the person with FAS. Advocacy activities are conducted by an advocate (for example, a family member, friend, or case manager) and fall into three basic categories. An advocate for FAS: (1) interprets FAS and the disabilities that arise from it and explains it to the environment in which the person operates, (2) engenders change or accommodation on behalf of the person, and (3) assists the person in developing and reaching attainable goals.

The advocacy model is often recommended, for example, when developing an individualized education program (IEP) for the person's progress at school.

An understanding of the developmental framework would presumably inform and enhance the advocacy model, but advocacy also implies interventions at a systems level as well, such as educating schools, social workers, and so forth on best practices for FAS. However, several organizations devoted to FAS also use the advocacy model at a community practice level as well.

Public health and policy
Treating FAS at the public health and public policy level promotes FAS prevention and diversion of public resources to assist those with FAS. It is related to the advocacy model but promoted at a systems level (rather than with the individual or family), such as developing community education and supports, state or province level prevention efforts (e.g., screening for maternal alcohol use during OB/GYN or prenatal medical care visits), or national awareness programs. Several organizations and state agencies in the U.S. are dedicated to this type of intervention.

As of 2016, the US Centers for Disease Control estimated 3 million women in the United States are at risk of having a baby with FASD, and recommended that women of child-bearing age should be on birth control or abstain from drinking alcohol as the safest way to avoid this.

Prognosis
The prognosis of FASD is variable depending on the type, severity, and if treatment is issued. Prognostic disabilities are divided into primary and secondary disabilities.

Primary disabilities
The primary disabilities of FAS are the functional difficulties with which the child is born as a result of CNS damage due to prenatal alcohol exposure.

Often, primary disabilities are mistaken as behavior problems, but the underlying CNS damage is the originating source of a functional difficulty, rather than a mental health condition, which is considered a secondary disability. The exact mechanisms for functional problems of primary disabilities are not always fully understood, but animal studies have begun to shed light on some correlates between functional problems and brain structures damaged by prenatal alcohol exposure. Representative examples include:
 Learning impairments are associated with impaired dendrites of the hippocampus
 Impaired motor development and functioning are associated with reduced size of the cerebellum
 Hyperactivity is associated with decreased size of the corpus callosum

Functional difficulties may result from CNS damage in more than one domain, but common functional difficulties by domain include: Note that this is not an exhaustive list of difficulties.
 Achievement: Learning disabilities
 Adaptive behavior: Poor impulse control, poor personal boundaries, poor anger management, stubbornness, intrusive behavior, too friendly with strangers, poor daily living skills, developmental delays
 Attention: Attention-deficit/hyperactivity disorder (ADHD), poor attention or concentration, distractible
 Cognition: Intellectual disability, confusion under pressure, poor abstract skills, difficulty distinguishing between fantasy and reality, slower cognitive processing
 Executive functioning: Poor judgment, information-processing disorder, poor at perceiving patterns, poor cause and effect reasoning, inconsistent at linking words to actions, poor generalization ability
 Language: Expressive or receptive language disorders, grasp parts but not whole concepts, lack understanding of metaphor, idioms, or sarcasm
 Memory: Poor short-term memory, inconsistent memory and knowledge base
 Motor skills: Poor handwriting, poor fine motor skills, poor gross motor skills, delayed motor skill development (e.g., riding a bicycle at appropriate age)
 Sensory processing and soft neurological problems: sensory processing disorder, sensory defensiveness, undersensitivity to stimulation
 Social communication: Intrude into conversations, inability to read nonverbal or social cues, "chatty" but without substance

Secondary disabilities
The secondary disabilities of FAS are those that arise later in life secondary to CNS damage. These disabilities often emerge over time due to a mismatch between the primary disabilities and environmental expectations; secondary disabilities can be ameliorated with early interventions and appropriate supportive services.

Six main secondary disabilities were identified in a University of Washington research study of 473 subjects diagnosed with FAS, PFAS (partial fetal alcohol syndrome), and ARND (alcohol-related neurodevelopmental disorder):
 Mental health problems: Diagnosed with ADHD, clinical depression, or other mental illness, experienced by over 90% of the subjects
 Disrupted school experience: Suspended or expelled from school or dropped out of school, experienced by 60% of the subjects (age 12 and older)
 Trouble with the law: Charged with or convicted of a crime, experienced by 60% of the subjects (age 12 and older)
 Confinement: For inpatient psychiatric care, inpatient chemical dependency care, or incarcerated for a crime, experienced by about 50% of the subjects (age 12 and older)
 Inappropriate sexual behavior: Sexual advances, sexual touching, or promiscuity, experienced by about 50% of the subjects (age 12 and older)
 Alcohol and drug problems: Abuse or dependency, experienced by 35% of the subjects (age 12 and older)

Two additional secondary disabilities exist for adults:
 Dependent living: Group home, living with family or friends, or some sort of assisted living, experienced by 80% of the subjects (age 21 and older)
 Problems with employment: Required ongoing job training or coaching, could not keep a job, unemployed, experienced by 80% of the subjects (age 21 and older)

Protective factors and strengths
Eight factors were identified in the same study as universal protective factors that reduced the incidence rate of the secondary disabilities:
 Living in a stable and nurturing home for over 73% of life
 Being diagnosed with FAS before age six
 Never having experienced violence
 Remaining in each living situation for at least 2.8 years
 Experiencing a "good quality home" (meeting 10 or more defined qualities) from age 8 to 12 years old
 Having been found eligible for developmental disability (DD) services
 Having basic needs met for at least 13% of life
 Having a diagnosis of FAS (rather than another FASD condition)

Malbin (2002) has identified the following areas of interests and talents as strengths that often stand out for those with FASD and should be utilized, like any strength, in treatment planning:
 Music, playing instruments, composing, singing, art, spelling, reading, computers, mechanics, woodworking, skilled vocations (welding, electrician, etc.), writing, poetry
 Participation in non-impact sport or physical fitness activities

Lifespan 
One study found that the people with FASD had a significantly shorter life expectancy. With the average life span of 34 years old, a study found that 44% of the deaths were of "external cause", with 15% of deaths being suicides.

Epidemiology
FASD is estimated to affect between 2% and 5% of people in the United States and Western Europe. FAS is believed to occur in between 0.2 and 9 per 1000 live births in the United States. The lifetime costs of an individual with FAS were estimated to be two million USD in 2002. Drinking any quantity during pregnancy, the risk of giving birth to a child with FASD is about 15%, and to a child with FAS about 1.5%. Drinking large quantities, defined as 2 standard drinks a day, or 6 standard drinks in a short time, carries a 4.3% risk of a FAS birth (i.e. one of every 23 heavy-drinking pregnant women will deliver a child with FAS). In a recent count the prevailence of having any FASD disorder was 1 person out of 20, but some people estimate it could be as high as 1 in 7.

Australia 

FASD among Australian youth is more common in indigenous Australians. The only states that have registered birth defects in Australian youth are Western Australia, New South Wales, Victoria and South Australia. In Australia, only 12% of Australian health professionals are aware of the diagnostics and symptoms of FASD. In Western Australia, the rate of births resulting in FASD is 0.02 per 1,000 births for non-Indigenous Australians, however among indigenous births the rate is 2.76 per 1,000 births. In Victoria, there have been no registered FASD related births for indigenous Australians, but the rate for the general population in Victoria is 0.01–0.03 per 1000 births. There have been no dedicated FASD clinics within Western Australia, but there are also no nationally supported diagnostic criteria anywhere in Australia. Passive surveillance is a prevention technique used within Australia to assist in monitoring and establishing detectable defects during pregnancy and childhood.

History

From the 1960s to the 1980s, alcohol was commonly used as a tocolytic, a method to stop preterm labor. The method originated with Dr. Fritz Fuchs, the chairman of the department of obstetrics and gynecology at Cornell University Medical College. Doctors recommended a small amount of alcohol to calm the uterus during contractions in early pregnancy or Braxton Hicks contractions. In later stages of pregnancy, the alcohol was administered intravenously and often in large amounts. "Women experienced similar effects as occur with oral ingestion, including intoxication, nausea and vomiting, and potential alcohol poisoning, followed by hangovers when the alcohol was discontinued." Vomiting put the mother at a high risk for aspiration and was "a brutal procedure for all involved". Because the alcohol was being given intravenously, the doctor could continue giving the treatment to the mother long after she had passed out, resulting in her being more intoxicated than would otherwise be possible. Such heavy intoxication is highly likely to contribute to FASD.

Historical references
Admonitions against prenatal alcohol use from ancient Greek, Roman, Talmudic, and possibly Biblical sources indicate a historical awareness of links between alcohol use and fetal development, although sources rarely if ever distinguish maternal alcohol consumption from paternal. For example, Plato writes in his fourth-century B.C. Laws (6.775): "Drinking to excess is a practice that is nowhere seemly ... nor yet safe. ... It behooves both bride and bridegroom to be sober ... in order to ensure, as far as possible, in every case that the child that is begotten may be sprung from the loins of sober parents." Likewise, the sixth-century A.D. Talmud (Kethuboth 60b) cautions, "One who drinks  intoxicating liquor will have ungainly children." In such ancient sources, the warnings against alcohol consumption for fetal development are more frequently concerned with conception than pregnancy.

In 1725, British physicians petitioned the House of Commons on the effects of strong drink when consumed by pregnant women saying that such drinking is "too often the cause of weak, feeble, and distempered children, who must be, instead of an advantage and strength, a charge to their country". There are many other such historical references. In Gaelic Scotland, the mother and nurse were not allowed to consume ale during pregnancy and breastfeeding. Claims that alcohol consumption caused idiocy were also part of the Teetotalism movement's message in the 19th century, but such claims, despite some attempts to offer evidence, were ignored because no mechanism could be advanced.

The earliest recorded observation of possible links between maternal alcohol use and fetal damage was made in 1899 by Dr. William Sullivan, a Liverpool prison physician who noted higher rates of stillbirth for 120 alcoholic female prisoners than their sober female relatives; he suggested the causal agent to be alcohol use. This contradicted the predominating belief at the time that heredity caused intellectual disability, poverty, and criminal behavior, which contemporary studies on the subjects usually concluded. A case study by Henry H. Goddard of the Kallikak family—popular in the early 1900s—represents this earlier perspective, though later researchers have suggested that the Kallikaks almost certainly had FAS. General studies and discussions on alcoholism throughout the mid-1900s were typically based on a heredity argument.

Prior to fetal alcohol syndrome being specifically identified and named in 1973, only a few studies had noted differences between the children of mothers who used alcohol during pregnancy or breast-feeding and those who did not, and identified alcohol use as a possible contributing factor rather than heredity.

In France in 1957, Jacqueline Rouquette had described 100 children whose parents were alcoholics in a thesis, which was not published. "She gave a good description in certain cases of the facies" according to her mentor, Paul Lemoine.
In 1968, Paul Lemoine of Nantes, himself published a study in a French medical journal about children with distinctive features whose mothers were alcoholics, and in the U.S., Christy Ulleland and colleagues at the University of Washington Medical School had conducted an 18-month study in 1968–1969 documenting the risk of maternal alcohol consumption among the offspring of 11 alcoholic mothers.

Recognition as a syndrome
Fetal alcohol syndrome was named in 1973 by two dysmorphologists, Kenneth Lyons Jones and David Weyhe Smith of the University of Washington Medical School in Seattle, United States. They identified a pattern of "craniofacial, limb, and cardiovascular defects associated with prenatal onset growth deficiency and developmental delay" in eight unrelated children of three ethnic groups, all born to mothers who were alcoholics. The pattern of malformations indicated that the damage was prenatal. News of the discovery shocked some, while others were skeptical of the findings. While many syndromes are eponymous, i.e. named after the physician first reporting the association of symptoms, Smith named FAS after the causal agent of the symptoms. He reasoned that doing so would encourage prevention, believing that if people knew maternal alcohol consumption caused the syndrome, then abstinence during pregnancy would follow from patient education and public awareness. At the time, nobody was aware of the full range of possible birth defects from FAS or its rate of prevalence.
In 1978, within nine years of the Washington discovery, animal studies, including non-human monkey studies carried out at the University of Washington Primate Center by Sterling Clarren, had confirmed that alcohol was a teratogen. By 1978, 245 cases of FAS had been reported by medical researchers, and the syndrome began to be described as the most frequent known cause of intellectual disability. In 1979, the Washington and Nantes findings were confirmed by a research group in Gothenburg, Sweden. Researchers in France, Sweden, and the United States were struck by how similar these children looked, though they were not related, and how they behaved in the same unfocused and hyperactive manner.

Over time, as subsequent research and clinical experience suggested that a range of effects could arise from prenatal alcohol exposure, the term "fetal alcohol effects" was used, but retired in 1996 and replaced with ARBD and ARND. In 2002, the US Congress mandated that the CDC develop diagnostic guidelines for FAS and in 2004 a definition of a term that already had been used by some in the nineties, the Fetal Alcohol Spectrum Disorder (FASD) was adopted, to include FAS as well as other conditions resulting from prenatal alcohol exposure. 
Currently, FAS is the only expression of prenatal alcohol exposure defined by the International Statistical Classification of Diseases and Related Health Problems and assigned ICD-9 and diagnoses.

In fiction
In Aldous Huxley's 1932 novel Brave New World (where all fetuses are gestated in vitro in a factory), lower caste fetuses are created by receiving alcohol transfusions (Bokanovsky Process) to reduce intelligence and height, thus conditioning them for simple, menial tasks. Connections between alcohol and incubating embryos are made multiple times in the novel.

The main character of the 2009 film Defendor is implied to have the condition.

Tony Loneman, a character in Tommy Orange's novel There There, was born with fetal alcohol syndrome, which he calls "the Drome".

See also 
 Alcohol and pregnancy
 Smoking and pregnancy
 Environmental toxicants and fetal development

References

External links 

 
 Center for Disease Control's page on Fetal Alcohol Spectrum Disorders (FASDs)

Alcohol and health
Health effects of alcohol
Congenital malformation due to exogenous toxicity
Teratogens
Syndromes
Neurological disorders
Neurological disorders in children
Neurodevelopmental disorders
Congenital disorders of nervous system
Spectrum disorders
Health issues in pregnancy
Wikipedia medicine articles ready to translate
Biology of attention deficit hyperactivity disorder
Mental disorders due to brain damage
Syndromes with intellectual disability